Großreuth bei Schweinau station is a Nuremberg U-Bahn station, located on the U3. Named for the borough Großreuth bei Schweinau. Opening in October 2020 it was the 49th station of Nuremberg U-Bahn to open and serves as the terminus for line U3 until the opening of further extensions towards Gebersdorf.

References

Nuremberg U-Bahn stations
Railway stations in Germany opened in 2020